Akmal Shorahmedov, (born 10 May 1986) is an Uzbekistani professional footballer who currently plays as a right back for FC AGMK.

Career
On 24 February 2011 Bunyodkor's site presented and announced Akmal Shorahmedov as Bunyodkor's player for Season 2011.

Career statistics

Club

International

Statistics accurate as of match played 23 March 2018

Honours
Bunyodkor
 Uzbek League (2): 2011, 2013
 Uzbek League runners-up (1): 2012
 Uzbek Cup (2): 2012, 2013
 Uzbekistan Super Cup (1): 2014

References

External links 
 
 

1986 births
Living people
Uzbekistani footballers
Place of birth missing (living people)
2015 AFC Asian Cup players
Association football defenders
2019 AFC Asian Cup players
Uzbekistan international footballers